Monomorium taprobanae is a species of ant of the subfamily Myrmicinae. It is found in Sri Lanka.

References

External links

 at antwiki.org
Itis.org

taprobanae
Hymenoptera of Asia